Chira Prabandhayodhin (born 21 May 1939) is a Thai former sports shooter. He competed in the 50 metre rifle, prone event at the 1972 Summer Olympics.

References

1939 births
Living people
Chira Prabandhayodhin
Chira Prabandhayodhin
Shooters at the 1972 Summer Olympics
Place of birth missing (living people)
Chira Prabandhayodhin
Southeast Asian Games medalists in shooting
Competitors at the 1987 Southeast Asian Games
Chira Prabandhayodhin